Oberrieden Dorf railway station ( is a railway station in Switzerland, situated on the banks of Lake Zürich in the town of Oberrieden. The station is located on the Thalwil–Arth-Goldau railway is served by the S24 line of the Zürich S-Bahn.

Oberreiden Dorf station should not be confused with the nearby, but lower level, Oberrieden railway station, which is on the Lake Zürich left bank railway line.

Services 
 the following services stop at Oberrieden Dorf:

References

External links 
 
 

Railway stations in the canton of Zürich
Swiss Federal Railways stations